Essie B Hollis (born May 16, 1955) is an American retired professional basketball player. He played at the small forward position.

College career
Born in Erie, Pennsylvania, Hollis attended St. Bonaventure University, where he played with the Bonnies.

Professional career
Hollis was drafted by the New Orleans Jazz, in the second round of the 1977 NBA draft. He spent one season in the National Basketball Association (NBA), as a member of the Detroit Pistons, during the 1978–79 season. He averaged, 2.8 points, 1.8 rebounds, and 0.2 assists per game. Before, Hollis had played with Askatuak ("The free ones") in Donostia / San Sebastian, Spain in 1977–78. He also played in Italy.

External links

 Essie Hollis – Lega Basket Serie A player profile 
 Essie Hollis  – Liga ACB player profile 

1955 births
Living people
American expatriate basketball people in Italy
American expatriate basketball people in Spain
American men's basketball players
Askatuak SBT players
Baloncesto León players
Basket Mestre 1958 players
Basketball players from Pennsylvania
CB L'Hospitalet players
Detroit Pistons players
Liga ACB players
New Orleans Jazz draft picks
Rochester Zeniths players
Saski Baskonia players
Small forwards
Sportspeople from Erie, Pennsylvania
St. Bonaventure Bonnies men's basketball players